The Duchy of Lancaster Act 1821 (1 & 2 Geo 4 c 52) was an Act of the Parliament of the United Kingdom. It was a public general Act. The unrepealed residue of this Act was omitted from the third revised edition of the statutes because of its local and personal nature.

The Duchy of Lancaster Act 1821 was repealed, excepting so far as any powers, provisions, matters or things related to or affected the Duchy of Lancaster or any of the hereditaments, possessions or property within the ordering and survey of the Duchy of Lancaster, by section 1 of the Crown Lands Act 1829 (10 Geo 4 c 50).

The whole Act, except sections 12 and 13 so far as they related to the Duchy of Lancaster, was repealed by section 1 of, and the Schedule to, the Statute Law Revision Act 1873.

Sections 12 and 13 were repealed by section 1(4) of, and the Schedule to, the Wild Creatures and Forest Laws Act 1971. The repeal of section 13 did not affect the operation of that section in relation to any existing power to depute or appoint gamekeepers.

References

United Kingdom Acts of Parliament 1821
Duchy of Lancaster